The Athinon Arena, sometimes referred to as Athens Arena, is a grand music venue in Athens, Greece. It was built in 2004 as a large-scale convention centre and concert hall, designed to host up to 3,000 people seated. It was owned by the Papatheoharis Group. Artists featured in the Arena are Marinella, Antonis Remos, Sakis Rouvas and Anna Vissi. Since 2005, it was the venue for the Greek preselection final Ellinikós Telikós, for the Eurovision Song Contest. On 23 and 24 September 2010, the arena was the venue for the 1st Eurovoice Music Contest, hosted by Pamela Anderson and Éric Serra, with special guests Sakis Rouvas, Enrique Iglesias and Anastacia.

Some of the shows hosted at the Athens Arena included: Marinella & Antonis Remos - Ta Logia Einai Peritta (2006), Marinella & Antonis Remos - S' Ena Tango (2007), Antonis Remos - Day+Night (2008), Anna Vissi - The Fabulous Show (2009), Anna Vissi & Sakis Rouvas - Face2Face Show (2010).

In 2014 the arena was transformed into a 1,600-seat theatre and renamed the Pantheon Theater. After three years operating as theatre for musicals, in 2017 the venue became again concert hall under its initial name Athinon Arena.

References

External links 
 Face2Face Show official site
 Pantheon Theater official website
 Athens Arena website

Theatres in Athens
Buildings and structures in Athens
Concert halls in Athens